Pego Club de Fútbol is a Spanish football team based in Pego, Alicante, in the autonomous community of Valencia. Founded in 1947, it plays in Regional Preferente – Group 3, holding home games at Camp de Futbol Cervantes, which has a capacity of 1,000 spectators.

Season to season

20 seasons in Tercera División

Notable former players
 Natalio
 Jorge Sanmiguel

Notable former coaches
 Nino Lema

External links
Official website
Futbolme.com profile
FFCV team profile 

Football clubs in the Valencian Community
Association football clubs established in 1947
Divisiones Regionales de Fútbol clubs
1947 establishments in Spain